July Mahlangu (born 5 July 1980 in Kwaggafontein, Mpumalanga) is a South African association football midfielder for Thanda Royal Zulu.

Mahlangu previously played in South Africa for Benoni Premier United F.C.

References

1980 births
Living people
People from Thembisile Hani Local Municipality
South African soccer players
Association football midfielders
Thanda Royal Zulu F.C. players